Son of the Circus (French: L'enfant du cirque, Italian: Il figlio del circo) is a 1963 French-Italian musical comedy film directed by Sergio Grieco and starring Ramuncho, Antonella Lualdi and Mario Feliciani.

The film's sets were designed by the art director Antonio Visone.

Cast
 Ramuncho as Rocco Antares 
 Antonella Lualdi as Jenny Nardelli 
 Mario Feliciani as Ministero Pubblico 
 Pierre Mondy as Philip Nardelli 
 Rik Battaglia as Steffi 
 Gina Rovere as Adua Senoner 
 Ubaldo Lay as Avv. Adami 
 Renzo Palmer as Paper, il pianista 
 Susan Terry
 Vittorio Sanipoli as Gillo Antares 
 Giuseppe Addobbati
 Goffredo Unger
 Mirko Ellis as Marcos 
 Sergio Ammirata as Giornalista

References

Bibliography 
 Jean A. Gili & Aldo Tassone. Parigi-Roma: 50 anni di coproduzioni italo-francesi (1945-1995). Editrice Il castoro, 1995.

External links 
 

1963 films
1963 musical comedy films
French musical comedy films
Italian musical comedy films
1960s Italian-language films
Films directed by Sergio Grieco
Pathé films
1960s Italian films
1960s French films
Italian-language French films